The Southwest Review is a literary journal published quarterly, based on the Southern Methodist University campus in Dallas, Texas. It is the third oldest literary quarterly in the United States.  The current editor-in-chief is Greg Brownderville.

The journal was formerly known as the Texas Review, and was started in 1915 at the University of Texas. In 1924 the magazine was transferred to SMU by Jay B. Hubbell and George Bond, who served as joint editors until 1927.

Famous contributors include: Quentin Bell, Amy Clampitt, Margaret Drabble, Natalia Ginzburg, James Merrill, Iris Murdoch, Howard Nemerov, Edmund White, Maxim Gorky, Cleanth Brooks, and Robert Penn Warren.

More recent contributors of note include:  Ann Harleman, Thomas Beller, Ben Fountain, Gerald Duff, and Jacob M. Appel.

Willard Spiegelman, the editor of Southwest Review since 1984, received the PEN/Nora Magid Award for Magazine Editing in 2005.

Honors and awards
Ann Harleman's story, Meanwhile, received an O. Henry Award in 2003.
Ben Fountain's story, Fantasy for Eleven Fingers, won an O. Henry Award in 2005.
Barbara Moss Klein's story, Little Edens, was short-listed for the O. Henry Award in 2005.
Merritt Tierce's story, Suck It, was included in Best New Stories from the South 2008.
Jacob Appel's story, Rods and Cones, was short-listed for Best American Nonrequired Reading in 2008.

See also
List of literary magazines
Southern Methodist University Press

References

External links
Official Website
Southwest Review archive at HathiTrust

1915 establishments in Texas
Literary magazines published in the United States
Magazines established in 1915
Magazines published in Texas
Mass media in Dallas
Quarterly magazines published in the United States
Southern Methodist University